The South African Railways Class 12A 4-8-2 of 1919 was a steam locomotive.

Between 1919 and 1929, the South African Railways placed 67  steam locomotives  with a 4-8-2 Mountain type wheel arrangement in service. Between 1947 and 1953, eight were also built for industrial use.

Manufacturers
The Class 12A was the final locomotive design by D.A. Hendrie, Chief Mechanical Engineer (CME) of the South African Railways (SAR) from 1910 to 1922, and one of his finest. It was an improved and larger version of his Class 12 locomotive, with larger diameter cylinders to increase tractive effort and a redesigned boiler.

Between 1919 and 1929, altogether 67 of them were built on five orders, 48 by the North British Locomotive Company (NBL) in Scotland and 19 by Henschel and Son in Kassel, Germany.
 The first twenty were built by NBL and were delivered in 1919, numbered in the range from 1520 to 1539.
 These were followed by another fifteen from NBL, which were built in late 1919 but were only delivered in 1921, numbered in the range from 2111 to 2125.
 The Henschel-built locomotives only arrived several years later. Six were delivered in 1928 and numbered in the range from 1540 to 1545.
 Another thirteen were delivered by Henschel in 1929, numbered in the ranges from 1546 to 1550 and 2103 to 2110, filling the gaps in the numbering sequence.
 The final thirteen, once again built by NBL, were also delivered in 1929 and numbered in the range from 2126 to 2138.

Characteristics
At the time, these locomotives were of the maximum size permissible for the Mountain type on Cape gauge. They were designed primarily to supplement the Class 12 locomotives which were already working on the coal line between Witbank and Germiston. Since these engines had a slightly heavier axle load than the predecessor Class 12, it was foreseen that they would be able to take a slightly increased load on the Witbank-Germiston section.

The locomotives were built on  plate frames. They were superheated and had piston valves, Walschaerts valve gear and Belpaire fireboxes which included combustion chambers. The boilers of the first two batches of 1919 and 1921 were equipped with Ramsbottom safety valves, while works pictures of the remainder show that they were equipped with Ross pop safety valves. The feedwater supply of the third and subsequent batches was by a top feed arrangement through copper pipes which were run from the running boards on each side to the top of the boiler ahead of the steam dome.

The original Class 12A superheater header was arranged with the Gresley type air valve which was introduced to prevent the risk of superheater elements being burned or damaged by overheating while engines were drifting. The valve automatically opened when the regulator was closed and allowed outside air to be drawn into the superheater elements. Even though experience showed that the heated air which then entered the steam chests and cylinders was harmful to cylinder lubrication with no apparent effect on the life of the superheater elements, it was some years before the use of these air valves was finally discontinued.

The first two batches, delivered in 1919 and 1921, were equipped with the Johnston link-and-pin couplers which had been in use since the establishment of the Cape Government Railways in 1873. By the time the third batch arrived in 1928, the SAR had begun to convert its Cape Gauge rolling stock to AAR knuckle couplers. The third to fifth batches were therefore delivered with the new coupling system.

Tenders
The locomotives were delivered new with two tender types, the Types MP1 and MT. While sources are unclear about which batches of the Class 12A were delivered with which tender type, builder's works photographs show the NBL-built locomotives of 1919 and 1921 with Type MP1 tenders, and the Henschel-built and subsequent NBL-built locomotives with Type MT tenders.

Type MP1 tender
On the Type MP1 tender, the top of its coal bunker sides were distinctly separate, mounted within the top edging of the water tank.

Many of these tenders were subsequently rebuilt to smooth-sided Type MR tenders with a  water capacity and a  axle load.

Type MT tender
The heavier Type MT tender had smooth sides all the way to the top of the coal bunker.

Reboilering
During the 1930s, many serving locomotives were reboilered with a standard boiler type designed by then CME A.G. Watson as part of his standardisation policy. In the process, they were then also equipped with Watson cabs with their distinctive slanted fronts, compared to the conventional vertical fronts of the original cabs. Such Watson Standard reboilered locomotives were reclassified by adding an "R" suffix to their classification.

When Class 12A locomotives numbers 1540 and 2135 became the first to be reboilered in 1943, however, none of the Watson Standard boilers were deemed suitable since the Watson Standard no. 2 series were too small, while the no. 3 series were too large. A special boiler was therefore designed for them by Dr. M.M. Loubser, the CME at the time. These boilers did not conform to any of the Watson Standard boilers and were a totally new type of rather massive proportions which, on a locomotive with relatively small coupled wheels, created an impression of great power. Certain features common to the Watson Standard boilers were incorporated in the design, however, since it was deemed necessary to have the greatest possible degree of interchangeability of parts with those of the Watson Standard boilers. The boiler size was between that of the Watson Standard numbers 2 and 3 boilers.

Unlike the original Class 12A boilers, initial and in-service repair cost considerations led to the Loubser boiler being built without a combustion chamber. The round-top firebox was radially stayed and the first two rows of stays were flexible. Similar stays were fitted in the side, back and throat plates and in the breaking zones. There were eight cross stays over the top of the firebox, which was of steel.

The original Belpaire boilers were fitted with Ramsbottom safety valves while, like the Watson Standard boilers, the Loubser boiler was fitted with two  Ross pop safety valves. Feedwater was supplied by two Davies and Metcalf injectors through a top-feed arrangement. At the firebox, the boiler was carried by a vertical transverse plate at the back and at the two front corners by sliding grease-lubricated shoes which rested on gunmetal liner plates which, in turn, were fixed to specially-designed steel brackets welded to the inside of the bridle casting. The boiler barrel was attached to the engine frame by four diaphragm plates, bolted to "T" sections which were riveted to the barrel.

Altogether 44 Class 12A locomotives were eventually reboilered with Loubser boilers and reclassified to Class 12AR. During the reboilering, which included the installation of Watson cabs, the locomotives were also equipped with a longer smokebox which resulted in the distinctive appearance of the Class 12AR. Like the Watson Standard boilers, the Loubser boilers also had the distinctive rectangular regulator cover just to the rear of the chimney. In the case of the Classes 12A and 12AR locomotives, three even more obvious differences are the extended smokebox, the Watson cab and the absence of the Belpaire firebox hump between the cab and boiler on the reboilered locomotives.

The reboilered locomotives were considered by some enginemen to be inferior steamers compared to the as-built engines. A shortened version of Loubser's Class 12AR boiler was later used on the new Class S1 shunting locomotives.

Service

South African Railways
When new, the Class 12A locomotives were placed in service hauling coal on the section from Witbank to Germiston. The unreboilered locomotives spent a large part of their working lives in Transvaal, mainly in Western Transvaal and shedded at Springs and Germiston, a few in Eastern Transvaal and shedded at Nelspruit and Waterval Boven, and one at De Aar in the Cape Province. The class also served in Natal during the late 1920s, probably after the arrival in numbers of the Class 15CA in 1929. Here they were worth two more coaches than a Class 14 on the 1921 mainline between Durban and Pietermaritzburg. A Class 12A locomotive was in charge of the last steam-hauled mainline passenger train to depart from Durban station after electric traction reached Durban from Pietermaritzburg during 1936. In 1977, all the remaining Class 12A locomotives were relocated to the Cape Northern system for shunting at De Aar and at Beaconsfield in Kimberley.

The more numerous reboilered Class 12AR locomotives worked throughout most parts of South Africa, being shedded at Kimberley, De Aar, Port Elizabeth and East London in the Cape Province, Glencoe and Newcastle in Natal, Klerksdorp in Transvaal and Kroonstad in the Orange Free State. East London and Port Elizabeth each received four, the latter being allocated engine numbers 1544, 1545, 2125 and 2129 for use on the fast Saturday morning passenger trains to Cape Town.

The Classes 12A and 12AR versions both proved to be very successful engines which performed well, with low repair costs. Modifications in design of details after entering service were negligible.

Industrial service
None of the SAR Class 12A or Class 12AR locomotives were sold into industrial service, but between 1947 and 1953 eight Class 12A locomotives, similar to the unreboilered SAR locomotives but without superheaters, were built new for industrial service by NBL.

Works numbers
The builders, years built, works numbers, reboilering particulars and original tender types are listed in the table.

Preservation

Illustration

References

1710
1710
4-8-2 locomotives
2D1 locomotives
NBL locomotives
Henschel locomotives
Cape gauge railway locomotives
Railway locomotives introduced in 1919
1919 in South Africa